Stewart Bridge may refer to:

Stewart Bridge (Oak, Nebraska), near Oak, Nebraska, listed on the NRHP in Nebraska
Stewart Bridge (Walden, Oregon), listed on the NRHP in Oregon